The Hudson River Museum, located in Trevor Park in Yonkers, New York, is the largest museum in Westchester County. The Yonkers Museum, founded in 1919 at City Hall, became the Hudson River Museum in 1948. While often considered an art museum by the public, due to the extensive collection of Hudson River School paintings, the museum also features exhibits on the history, science and heritage of the region.

History

Founded in 1919 as the Yonkers Museum, the facility was also known as the Yonkers Museum of Science and the Arts, prior to being named the Hudson River Museum. The museum originally contained a number of mineral specimens housed in Yonkers City Hall. Photographer Rudolf Eickemeyer Jr., a lifelong resident of Yonkers, played a key role in the creation of the museum, as did sculptor Isidore Konti, and George J. Stengel.

Central to its history is the Glenview Mansion, a house built in 1877 from a design by American architect Charles W. Clinton, and once the home of one John Bond Trevor. Home of the museum for 45 years from 1929, the house now forms a large part of the Hudson River Museum. It contains six period rooms displaying furniture and decor from that era. In 1972 it was listed on the National Register of Historic Places. The Museum is accredited by the American Alliance of Museums, a mark of excellence it has maintained since 1974. The rooms on public display feature carved woodwork by Philadelphia cabinetmaker Daniel Pabst.

In 1979, artist Red Grooms created and installed "The Bookstore" at Hudson River Museum, where it is on permanent display.

The museum is the home of the Andrus Planetarium, the only public planetarium in Westchester County. It added the planetarium in 1969 to celebrate the beginning of the Space Age and the increasing interest in space. The planetarium was one part of the museum's expansion throughout the 1960s, which also included the construction of larger and more modern facilities to house its collections, followed by the restoration of the ground floor of the Glenview house to its 19th-century condition. The planetarium and its laser shows are credited with driving the museum's 30% increase in attendance in the early 1990s.

The museum's diversity is part of what led to its citation as one of the most unusual cultural facilities by the New York State Council on the Arts in 1972. It has sought to maintain this diversity amidst changes in leadership and focus throughout its history. The diversity is apparent in the museum's  site, on which a 2006 expansion attempted to better join the Glenview Mansion with the modern 1969 additions.

The museum used its namesake, the Hudson River, as the core of its 75th anniversary celebration in 1994. It celebrated its centennial in 2019.

In March 2014, the museum completed a renovation of the planetarium and installed a new Megastar which is capable of displaying up to 22 million stars compared to its Zeiss projector which displayed up to 5,000 stars.

Since 1995 the museum has offered a Junior Docent Program; the program was recognized by the President's Committee on the Arts and Humanities with a Coming Up Taller Award in 2008.

In November 2020, the museum broke ground on an expansion project, adding a  wing to the campus. The new wing will house special exhibition space, a 100-seat auditorium, an interior sculpture garden, and art storage space, also allowing the museum to display more of its permanent collection.

In popular culture
The museum's Glenview Mansion appears in HBO's series The Gilded Age, an American historical drama television series created by Julian Fellowes, which premiered in January 2022.

Funding
The late 1980s was a difficult time for the Hudson River Museum when it faced a decrease in funding, uncertainties in future funding, and a high level of staff turnover. The museum was forced to reduce its operating hours and cut some programming, but was able to expand the planetarium. The facility experienced a resurgence in the 1990s, received a number of grants and awards, saw increased funding from Westchester County, and was able to expand in time for its 75th anniversary. The museum also saw its attendance almost double from 55,000 to 100,000 between 1990 and 1994. The late 1990s saw a downturn in funding and the museum was again forced to face significant cutbacks. In the wake of these cutbacks, the museum began to host private events and offer tours, particularly to groups of school children, as a means of increasing income.

References

External links

 Hudson River Museum

Art museums and galleries in New York (state)
Hudson River
Buildings and structures in Yonkers, New York
Historic house museums in Westchester County, New York
Museums in Westchester County, New York
Natural history museums in New York (state)
Planetaria in the United States
Culture of Yonkers, New York
Government buildings completed in 1877
Art museums established in 1919
1919 establishments in New York (state)
Buildings and structures completed in 1969
Brutalist architecture in New York (state)